Keystone was a town in Adams County, Washington

Location: On Northern Pacific Railroad 16 miles NE of Ritzville, 10 miles SW of Sprague (east part of Section 9, T20N, R37E).

Keystone was on the site of the Harriston post office which was in operation from October 12, 1883 to September 22, 1884.  It is believed that it had the name Keystone from as far back as 1880 for an item in the Walla Walla Union of July 17, 1880 named it as a new “railroad town”. The Gazateer of 1907 described it as a “Station named Harrison (sic)” with a population of 20 people. At that time Smith & Sons were the general merchants, Carmichael Brothers also had a general store and a hotel, E M Robish dealt in lumber and fuel and J W Smith with the blacksmith, no doubt he being Keystone’s first postmaster.  Keystone was a grain shipping point and in 1907 C L Fish, Kerr, Gifford and Company and Puget Sound Wholesale Company were grain dealers.

John W Smith was born in 1856 in Beaver County, Penn.  He leaned the blacksmithing trade and set up his first shop in Elwood, IL.  In 1883 he came west, first to Oregon and then to Rockford, Spokane County, where he erected the first brick block in that town.  He was a delegate to the Constitutional Convention in 1889.  He came to Keystone in 1901.

The community was named after Pennsylvania, the Keystone State, the former home of an early postmaster.

Postmasters:

Established October 23, 1901, John W Smith

David W Circle, March 25, 1905

Rolla T Stone, August 21, 1909

Myrtle S VanBuren, August 2, 1912

Discontinued May 1, 1925 – mail to Sprague (Lincoln County)

References

Ghost towns in Washington (state)
Adams County, Washington